Syed Ata-ul-Muhaimin Bukhari (1 July 1944 – 8 February 2021) (سید عطاء المہیمن بخاری ) was a Pakistani politico-religious leader, President of Majlis-e-Ahrar-ul-Islam and the son of Syed Ata Ullah Shah Bukhari.

References

1945 births
2021 deaths
Pakistani politicians
Deobandis
Persian-language poets
Pakistani religious leaders
Politicians from Patna
People from Multan
Presidents of Majlis-e-Ahrar-ul-Islam

ur:سید عطاء اللہ شاہ بخاری